Heinrich Hoffmann or Hoffman may refer to:

Hoffmann
Heinrich Hoffmann (photographer) (1885–1957), German photographer
Heinrich Hoffmann (author) (1809–1894), German psychiatrist and author
Heinrich Hoffmann (sport shooter) (1869–?), German Olympic shooter
Heinrich Hoffmann (pilot) (1913–1941), World War II German flying ace

Hoffman
Anglicized form
Heinrich Hoffman (1836–1894), American Civil War veteran

See also
Heinrich Hofmann (disambiguation)